Yamini is a 1973 Indian Malayalam film, directed by M. Krishnan Nair and produced by Joy and M. S. Joseph. The film stars Madhu, Jayabharathi, Muthukulam Raghavan Pillai and Adoor Bhavani in the lead roles. The film had musical score by M. K. Arjunan.

Cast

Madhu as Gopalakrishnan
Jayabharathi as Indira
P. K. Abraham
Muthukulam Raghavan Pillai
Adoor Bhavani
Adoor Pankajam as Dakshayani
Alummoodan as Nanukkuttan
Bahadoor
Kavitha
Kottarakkara Sreedharan Nair
P. K. Venukkuttan Nair
Sadhana

Soundtrack
The music was composed by M. K. Arjunan and the lyrics were written by Kanam E. J.

References

External links
 

1973 films
1970s Malayalam-language films
Films directed by M. Krishnan Nair